Qapan or Kapan or Qupan may refer to:
 Qapan-e Olya
 Qapan-e Sofla